Grim is a surname. Notable people with the surname include:

Allan Kuhn Grim, (1904–1965), American federal judge
Bob Grim (baseball), Major League Baseball player
Bob Grim (American football), American football player
Bobby Grim, American racecar driver
Emanuel Grim (1883–1950), Polish priest and writer
Fred Grim (born 1965), Dutch retired football goalkeeper
Harriet Grim, American suffragist
John Grim (baseball) (1867–1961), Major League Baseball player
Morgan Grim (born 1988), American basketball player